C. C. Countess was a college football player from Duncanville, Alabama. He was the first All-Southern player for the Alabama Crimson Tide.

References

All-Southern college football players
American football centers
Players of American football from Alabama
Alabama Crimson Tide football players
People from Tuscaloosa County, Alabama